Kattendijk Sands is a five million years old marine geological formation north of Antwerp, Belgium. including the north-western parts of the Campine region.

The area was named by De Heuter and Laga in 1976. The sands range from medium fine to coarse and contain a large proportion of shell grit.

Geology
The clay of the Rupelian era developed to a depth of approximately  beneath a deposit of Neogene sand. The formation has a Miocene Era aquifer, while the clay level dates to the Pliocene.

Palaeontology
A Pliocene species of auk (Alca stewarti) was found in 2000.

References

External links
 

Geography of Belgium
Geology of Belgium